The North Rustico Harbour Light  is an active  lighthouse on the central north coast of Prince Edward Island, Canada. The station was established in 1876 and the lighthouse itself was built in 1899. It is still active, and has a focal plane of 12.5 m (41 ft); and a yellow light, 5 seconds on, 5 seconds off. The tower itself is 10 m (34 ft) high with a square pyramidal wood tower with lantern and gallery.

See also
 List of lighthouses in Prince Edward Island
 List of lighthouses in Canada

References

External links
 North Rustico Harbour Lighthouse Marinas.com
North Rustico Harbour Lighthouse Lighthouse Friends
 Aids to Navigation Canadian Coast Guard

Lighthouses in Prince Edward Island
Lighthouses completed in 1899
Heritage sites in Prince Edward Island
1899 establishments in Canada
Lighthouses on the Canadian Register of Historic Places